The  is a traditional Japanese unit of length, equal to six Japanese feet (shaku). It is now standardized as 1.82 m.

Although mostly supplanted by the metric system, this unit is a common measurement in Japanese architecture, where it is used as a proportion for the intervals between the pillars of traditional-style buildings. In this context, it is commonly translated as "bay". The length also appears in other contexts, such as the standard length of the bō staff in Japanese martial arts and the standard dimensions of the tatami mats. As these are used to cover the floors of most Japanese houses, floor surfaces are still commonly measured not in square meters but in "tatami" which are equivalent to half of a square ken.

Word

Among English loanwords of Japanese origin, both ken and ma are derived from readings of the same character .

This kanji graphically combines  "door" and  "sun". The earlier variant character  was written with  "moon" rather than "sun", depicting "A  door through the crevice of which the  moonshine peeps in".

The diverse Japanese pronunciations of  include on'yomi Sino-Chinese readings (from jian  or  "room; between; gap; interval") of kan "interval; space; between; among; discord; favorable opportunity" or ken "six feet"; and kun'yomi native Japanese readings of ai "interval; between; medium; crossbred", aida or awai "space; interval; gap; between; among; midway; on the way; distance; time; period; relationship", or ma "space; room; interval; pause; rest (in music); time; a while; leisure; luck; timing; harmony".

History

The ken is based on the Chinese jian. It uses the same Chinese character as the Korean kan.  

A building's proportions were (and, to a certain extent, still are) measured in ken, as for example in the case of Enryaku-ji's Konponchū-dō (Main Hall), which measures 11×6 bays (37.60 m × 23.92 m), of which 11×4 are dedicated to the worshipers. Traditional buildings usually measure an odd number of bays, for example 3×3 or 5×5. A type of temple's gate called rōmon can have dimensions going from 5×2 bays to the more common 3×2 bays down to even 1×1 bay. The Zen butsuden in the illustration measures 5×5 ken across externally because its 3×3 ken core (moya) is surrounded by a 1-ken aisle called hisashi.

The value of a ken could change from building to building, but was usually kept constant within the same structure. There can however be exceptions. Kasuga Taisha's tiny honden'''s dimensions, for example, are 1×1 in ken, but 1.9×2.6 in meters.

The distance between pillars was standardized very early and started being used as a unit of measurement. Land area in particular was measured using the ken as a basis. The unit was born out of the necessity to measure land surface to calculate taxes. After the Edo period, the ken started to be called .Iwanami Kōjien

References
Citations

Bibliography
 Japanese Art Net User System (JAANUS) Dictionary of Japanese Architectural and Art Historical Terminology, articles Kasuga-zukuri, Ken and Kondō''. Accessed on May 6, 2009
 Iwanami  Japanese dictionary, 6th Edition (2008), DVD version

Japanese architectural features
Units of length